Tore Andreas Gundersen (born 4 February 1986) is a retired football player.

Gundersen was born in Kongsvinger, grew up in Flisa and is a son of politician and former swimmer Gunnar Gundersen. Gundersen began his career with Flisa IL, before joining Kongsvinger IL in January 2003. After three years there he signed for Lillestrøm SK in January 2007. After a disappointing season he joined Lyngby Boldklub on a loan in August 2008. In Denmark he scored four goals in nine games for Lyngby Boldklub and returned to Lillestrøm, and was subsequently loaned out to Nybergsund IL-Trysil in January 2009. In January 2010, he moved to Germany, joining Dynamo Dresden of the 3. Liga. Ahead of the 2011 season he joined Hamarkameratene.

Career statistics

References

1986 births
Living people
People from Åsnes
Norwegian footballers
Kongsvinger IL Toppfotball players
Lillestrøm SK players
Lyngby Boldklub players
Nybergsund IL players
Dynamo Dresden players
Hamarkameratene players
Ullensaker/Kisa IL players
Norwegian First Division players
Eliteserien players
Norwegian expatriate footballers
Expatriate men's footballers in Denmark
Expatriate footballers in Germany
Norwegian expatriate sportspeople in Denmark
Norwegian expatriate sportspeople in Germany
Danish 1st Division players
3. Liga players
Association football forwards
Sportspeople from Innlandet